Henri Aimé Duhem (7 April 1860, Douai - 24 October 1941, Juan-les-Pins) was a French Impressionist painter.

Biography 
He was descended from an old Flemish family and originally practiced as a lawyer. In 1887, his passion for drawing and watercolors finally led him to go to Paris and enroll in the drawing classes of Henri Harpignies. While there, he became friends with Émile Breton, who introduced him  to oil painting. Breton's niece, Virginie Demont-Breton (the daughter of Jules Breton), introduced him to a young painter named Marie Sergeant, whom he married in 1890.

At about that time, Demont-Breton moved to a small village named Wissant. Encouraged to follow, the Duhems established a home in Camiers and gathered their artist friends together to form what would be known as the "École de Wissant", some of the most notable members of which were Georges Maroniez, Francis Tattegrain and Fernand Stiévenart. In 1893, he fully abandoned his legal career to devote himself to art, both as a creator and an avid collector of work by his contemporaries. He and his wife travelled extensively as he began to exhibit more widely abroad.

Personal losses
During the early part of World War I, he and Marie lost their only son Rémy at the assault on Les Éparges (20 June 1915). Marie was deeply affected and never truly recovered. She died of a neglected tumor in 1918, during the occupation. Because of his legal experience, Duhem was called upon to assist with the administration of Douai. His painful memories of this period are recorded in a book called La Mort du foyer (The Death of a Home, Éditions Figuière, 1922).

In the inter-war period, he remained artistically active, preparing a major show at the Salon des Tuileries in 1923, commuting between Douai and Paris, where he maintained a home in the Sixteenth Arrondissement. In 1932, he was named a Commander in the Légion d'honneur. Five years later, faced with declining health and the threat of war, he moved to Juan-les-Pins, where he lived at the villa "Mont Riant" until his death.

In 1985, his priceless art collection was donated to the Musée Marmottan by his adopted daughter Nelly, following his wishes.

References

Other writings by Duhem
 Renaissances, éditions Clerget, 1897.
 Impressions d’Art Contemporain, éditions Figuière, 1913.
 Ève ou l'épicier, éditions de la Flandre, 1935.

Further reading
 Camille Mauclair, Marie Duhem, Rémy Duhem : hommage, éditions Jacomet, 1924.
 Jacqueline Chœur, three articles : "La Maison Duhem", in the journal Les Amis de Douai,1986, pgs.57-61; "Rencontre avec les Duhem",  and "Les correspondants des Duhem" in the  Société d'Agriculture, Sciences et Arts de Douai, 1992-1995, Fifth series (1996), pgs.71-79and pgs. 81-86.
 Sylvie Carlier, Le couple Henri et Marie Duhem à Douai au 10 rue d'Arras, in the journal Les Amis de Douai, 2001, pgs.22-24.

External links

 
 Arcadja Auctions: More works by Duhem

1860 births
1941 deaths
Impressionism
19th-century French painters
French male painters
20th-century French painters
20th-century French male artists
19th-century French male artists